Abdeladim El Guerrouj ( - born 1972, Berkane) is a Moroccan politician of the Popular Movement. Since 3 January 2012, he holds the position of Minister-Delegate for Public Service and the Modernization of the Administration in  the cabinet of Abdelilah Benkirane. Before he served as a civil servant in the Tax Administration department in Rabat.

See also
Cabinet of Morocco

References

External links
Department of the Modernization of the Administration
Department of Public Service

Living people
Government ministers of Morocco
1972 births
People from Berkane
Popular Movement (Morocco) politicians